Lieutenant-Colonel Maharaja Rana Shri Sir Natwarsinhji Bhavsinhji Sahib Bahadur, KCSI (30 June 1901 – 4 October 1979) was the last Maharaja of Porbandar belonging to Jethwa dynasty, who ascended the throne of princely state of Porbandar on 10 December 1908 and ruled until his state was merged into India on 15 February 1948.

Biography

He was the only son of Maharaja Rana Shri Bhavsinhji Madhavsinhji Sahib Bahadur, Rana Sahib of Porbandar, by his third wife, Maharani Bama Sahib Ramba Kunverba Sahiba of Bhavnagar State.

He was educated at the Rajkumar College at Rajkot and stood first in the diploma examination for all the Princes' colleges in India. He succeeded his father on his death on 10 December 1908 and ascended the throne on 26 January 1920 after he came of age.

He married twice, but had no children. He first married Rupaliba Sahiba (1898–1943) of Limbdi State in 1920 and, after her death, Anant Kunverba alias Annette de Silva (1911–1989) in 1954.

He captained India in his first Indian cricket team in England in 1932. He played in only four of the 26 first-class matches. In the era when only Royals used to hold position of Captains, in a rare gesture of sportsmanship, he stood down from the captaincy in favor of the more talented C.K. Nayudu for the Test against England. K. S. Ghanshyamsinhji, the elder brother of Rupaliba Sahiba, served as his vice captain.

Natwarsinhji was an avid painter, author and musician; his literary works include "From the Flow of Life" (1967), "India's Problems: Reflections of an Ex-Ruler" (1970) and "International Solidarity" (1975). He was the joint composer with AW Hansen, of Great Britain of  the "Oriental Moon Waltz" in 1930.

He gave land to Nanji Kalidas Mehta, to start Maharana Mills manufacturing textiles. After independence of India, he merged his state into the United State of Kathiawar on  15 February 1948. He also took active interest along with Nanji Kalidas Mehta to see that Kirti Mandir is being built in Porbandar, as a memorial to Mahatma Gandhi.

Maharaja Sir Natwarsinhji Jethwa of Porbandar died in 1979 after a 71-year reign, aged 78. Although he had adopted a son, Rajkumar Udaibhansinhji Jethwa, in 1941, he died in 1977 with no issue; therefore, the headship of the dynasty is still uncertain after decades.

Titles

1901–1908: Patvi Namdar Maharajkumar Shri Natwarsinhji Bhavsinhji Sahib
1908–1918: His Highness Maharaja Rana Shri Natwarsinhji Bhavsinhji Sahib Bahadur, Rana Sahib of Porbandar
1918–1929: His Highness Maharaja Rana Shri Natwarsinhji Bhavsinhji Sahib Bahadur, Maharaja Rana Sahib of Porbandar
1929–1941: His Highness Maharaja Rana Shri Sir Natwarsinhji Bhavsinhji Sahib Bahadur, Maharaja Rana Sahib of Porbandar, KCSI
1941–1945: Captain His Highness Maharaja Rana Shri Sir Natwarsinhji Bhavsinhji Sahib Bahadur, Maharaja Rana Sahib of Porbandar, KCSI
1945–1946: Major His Highness Maharaja Rana Shri Sir Natwarsinhji Bhavsinhji Sahib Bahadur, Maharaja Rana Sahib of Porbandar, KCSI
1946–1971: Lieutenant-Colonel His Highness Maharaja Rana Shri Sir Natwarsinhji Bhavsinhji Sahib Bahadur, Maharaja Rana Sahib of Porbandar, KCSI

Honours

Delhi Durbar Gold Medal – 1911
Knight Commander of the Order of the Star of India (KCSI) – 1929
King George V Silver Jubilee Medal – 1935
King George VI Coronation Medal – 1937
Indian Independence Medal – 1947

References

External links

 

Indian cricketers
1901 births
1979 deaths
Gujarati people
Knights Commander of the Order of the Star of India
Maharajas of Porbandar
Indian cricket captains
Hindu monarchs
Indian composers of Western classical music
English-language writers from India
Indian royalty
Indian knights
20th-century classical composers
20th-century Indian musicians
Roshanara Club cricketers
Viceroy's XI cricketers